The Bofors 25 mm M/32 was a Swedish designed and built light anti-aircraft gun that was used aboard ships of the Swedish Navy during the Second World War.

History
The development of Bofors first automatic weapons began in 1925 when the Navy requested the development of a 20 mm anti-aircraft gun. In 1928 the Navy requested a new 40 mm AA gun and a 25 mm AA gun which was produced in parallel and known as the M/32.

Design

The M/32 was designed with a barrel 64 calibers in length, fired a  25×205mmR cartridge, at 160–180 rpm and with a muzzle velocity of 850 m/s. Later a shorter version firing a 25×187mmR cartridge was produced in limited numbers. The M/32 looked similar to its larger 40 mm sibling and used the same long-recoil operating system and hydro-spring recoil mechanism. Its feed mechanism consisted of 6-round clips which were held in a vertical frame above the gun breech. Two clips were mounted side by side so that continuous fire could be maintained without the need to pause and change magazines. The clips were in two halves, which split and fell away as the cartridges entered the frames.

The gun was available in fixed single mount, fixed twin mount or on a mobile four-wheeled carriage with twin collapsible outriggers. In addition to fixed pedestal mounts, a retractable gun mount was designed for submarine use.  Although available in land mounts it was primarily a naval weapon.  At first the 40 mm gun was considered to be too heavy, so preference was given to single and twin mounts of the M/32 aboard ships of the Swedish navy.

Gallery

See also
25 mm Hotchkiss anti-aircraft gun
25 mm automatic air defense gun M1940 (72-K)
Type 96 25 mm AT/AA Gun

Notes

Bibliography
 Gander, T 1990, The 40mm Bofors Gun, 2nd edn, Patrick Stephens, Wellingborough, Eng.

External links
 http://www.quarryhs.co.uk/Bofors.htm
 http://www.quarryhs.co.uk/ammotable3.html

25 mm artillery
World War II anti-aircraft guns
Naval guns of Sweden
World War II naval weapons
Anti-aircraft guns of Sweden
Bofors
Autocannon